Ğäliä was a madrasa that was attached existed to Ufa's second cathedral mosque and existed between 1906 and 1919. Its founder and director was Zıya Kamali.

Since 1907, Ğäliä was located in a three-story building, specially built at the expense of Ufa landowner Sufiäbikä Cantürina and merchant Sädxi Nazirof; madrasa also received large financial assistance from Sälimgäräy Cantürin.

Apart from religious disciplines, there were taught Arabic, Tatar and Russian languages, philosophy, rhetoric, geography, history, arithmetic, chemistry, physics, physiology, etc. ― about 30 subjects in total.

Ğäliä was an alma mater for many Tatar, Bashkir, Kazakh and Uzbek writers, public figures and statesmen such as Galimcan İbrahimof, Şäyexzädä Babiç, Mäcit Ğafuri, Ğibadulla Alparof, Soltan Ğäbäşi, Xäsän Tufan, Şärif Sünçäläy, Kärim Xäkimef, Maǵjan Jumabaı, .

Zakir Qadıyri, Zäki Wälidi, Xuca Bädiği, Xäbibulla Zäyni, Ğiniätulla Tereğulov, Ğabdulla Sönasi, Ğalimcan İbrahimof, Säläx Atnağolof and others worked here as teachers in different years.

References

External links
 

20th-century madrasas
Cultural heritage monuments of regional significance in Bashkortostan
Buildings and structures in Ufa
Madrasas in the Russian Empire
1906 establishments in the Russian Empire